Type 927 acoustic surveillance ship is a type of vessel used by the People’s Liberation Army Navy. There are three known Type 927 ships, plus one predecessor Ruili No.10, which is slightly larger than Type 927 ships, and it was used to test onboard systems such as sonars for the three Type 927 ships. The first Type 927 ship was launched around June 2017 in Guangzhou. Type 927 has received NATO reporting name Dongjian class, 东监 in Chinese, meaning East Surveillance, because west first observed it performing acoustic surveillance missions in East China Sea.

Characteristics
Type 927 vessels are twin-hulled, with a displacement of approximately 5,000 tonnes. The ships are 90 meters long and have a beam of 30 meters.

Construction
The first photos of a Type 927 under construction surfaced in 2017. Two Type 927s were constructed in Huangpu District, Guangzhou, and the third was constructed at the Wuchang Shuangliu shipyard in Wuhan.

Ships
As of end of 2021,there are a total of four ships, including the predecessor unit:

References

2017 ships
Ships of the People's Liberation Army Navy
Military catamarans